Schizachyrium is a widespread genus of plants in the grass family. It refers to either the glume or the toothed lemmas.

In the United States, members of the genus are commonly known as bluestems.

Species
Species in the genus include:

 Schizachyrium beckii Killeen - Bolivia
 Schizachyrium bemarivense A.Camus - Madagascar
 Schizachyrium brevifolium (Sw.) Nees ex Buse – Serillo dulce - widespread in tropics
 Schizachyrium cirratum (Hack.) Wooton & Standl. - USA (AZ NM TX), Mexico, Venezuela, Colombia, Ecuador
 Schizachyrium claudopus (Chiov.) Chiov - Tanzania, Zaïre, Zambia
 Schizachyrium condensatum (Kunth) Nees – Colombian bluestem - West Indies, Latin America from central Mexico to Uruguay
 Schizachyrium crinizonatum S.T.Blake - Australia
 Schizachyrium cubense (Hack.) Nash - Cuba
 Schizachyrium delavayi (Hack.) Bor - China, Himalayas
 Schizachyrium delicatum Stapf - tropical Africa
 Schizachyrium djalonicum Jacq.-Fél. - Guinea to Sierra Leone
 Schizachyrium dolosum S.T.Blake - Northern Territory, Queensland
 Schizachyrium exile (Hochst.) Pilg. - tropical + southern Africa; Indian Subcontinent, Myanmar
 Schizachyrium fragile (R.Br.) A.Camus - southern China, Vietnam, Java, New Guinea, New Caledonia, Micronesia
 Schizachyrium gaumeri Nash - Yucatán Peninsula, Chiapas
 Schizachyrium gracile (Spreng.) Nash - West Indies, Guatemala, Chiapas, Florida
 Schizachyrium gracilipes (Hack.) A.Camus - southern Brazil, Paraguay, Uruguay, northeastern Argentina
 Schizachyrium gresicola Jacq.-Fél - Ghana, Guinea, Mali, Nigeria
 Schizachyrium hatschbachii Peichoto - Brazil, northern Argentina
 Schizachyrium impressum  (Hack.) A.Camus - Jammu & Kashmir
 Schizachyrium jeffreysii (Hack.) Stapf - Angola, Zambia, Zimbabwe, Malawi, Mozambique, Botswana, Namibia, Limpopo, Mpumalanga
 Schizachyrium kwiluense Vanderyst ex Robyns - Zaïre, Congo Republic
 Schizachyrium lomaense A.Camus - Sierra Leone, Liberia, Ivory Coast
 Schizachyrium lopollense (Rendle) Sales- Angola, Zambia, Mozambique
 Schizachyrium maclaudii (Jacq.-Fél.) S.T.Blake - West Africa
 Schizachyrium malacostachyum (J.Presl) Nash - Mesoamerica, Colombia, West Indies
 Schizachyrium maritimum (Chapm.) Nash – Gulf bluestem - USA (LA MS AL FL)
 Schizachyrium mexicanum (Hitchc.) A.Camus - Mexico
 Schizachyrium mitchellianum B.K.Simon - Western Australia
 Schizachyrium muelleri Nash - Veracruz
 Schizachyrium mukuluense Vanderyst - Zaïre
 Schizachyrium multinervosum Nash - Cuba
 Schizachyrium niveum (Swallen) Gould – Pinescrub bluestem - Florida, Georgia
 Schizachyrium nodulosum (Hack.) Stapf  - western + central Africa
 Schizachyrium occultum S.T.Blake - Northern Territory, Queensland
 Schizachyrium pachyarthron C.A.Gardner - Australia
 Schizachyrium parvifolium (Hitchc.) Borhidi & Catasús - Cuba
 Schizachyrium penicillatum Jacq.-Fél - Burkina Faso, Guinea, Sierra Leone
 Schizachyrium perplexum S.T.Blake - Northern Territory, Queensland
 Schizachyrium platyphyllum (Franch.) Stapf - Africa, Madagascar
 Schizachyrium pseudeulalia  (Hosok.) S.T.Blake - Flores, Maluku, Sulawesi, Philippines, New Guinea, northern Australia, Caroline Is
 Schizachyrium pulchellum (D.Don ex Benth.) Stapf  - tropical Africa
 Schizachyrium radicosum Jacq.-Fél - Guinea
 Schizachyrium reedii (Hitchc. & Ekman) Borhidi & Catasús - Cuba
 Schizachyrium rhizomatum (Swallen) Gould – Florida little bluestem - Florida
 Schizachyrium ruderale Clayton - western Africa
 Schizachyrium rupestre (K.Schum.) Stapf - tropical Africa, KwaZulu-Natal
 Schizachyrium salzmannii (Trin. ex Steud.) Nash  - Mexico, Honduras, Lesser Antilles, South America
 Schizachyrium sanguineum (Retz.) Alston – Crimson bluestem - tropical Africa, tropical Asia, New Guinea, Latin America, West Indies, USA (AZ NM TX FL GA AL)
 Schizachyrium scabriflorum (Rupr. ex Hack.) A.Camus - Bolivia, Paraguay, northern Argentina, southern Brazil
 Schizachyrium schweinfurthii (Hack.) Stapf - tropical Africa
 Schizachyrium scintillans Stapf  - tropical Africa
 Schizachyrium scoparium (Michx.) Nash – Little bluestem - widespread in Canada + USA + Mexico
 Schizachyrium semitectum (Swallen) Reeder - Mexico, Guatemala
 Schizachyrium spicatum (Spreng.) Herter - Uruguay, Paraguay, northern Argentina, southern Brazil
 Schizachyrium stoloniferum Nash - USA (MS AL GA FL NC SC)
 Schizachyrium sulcatum (Ekman) S.T.Blake - Colombia, Bolivia, western Brazil
 Schizachyrium tenerum Nees – Slender bluestem - USA (OK TX LA MS AL FL GA NC)
 Schizachyrium thollonii (Franch.) Stapf - tropical Africa
 Schizachyrium urceolatum (Hack.) Stapf - tropical Africa
 Schizachyrium yangambiense Germ. - Zaïre

Some species formerly included in Schizachyrum are now considered better suited to other genera: Andropogon,  Dichanthium,  Rottboellia,  Sehima,  Sphaerocaryum.

References

External links

 
Poaceae genera
Grasses of Africa
Grasses of Asia
Grasses of Oceania
Grasses of North America
Grasses of South America
Taxa named by Christian Gottfried Daniel Nees von Esenbeck
Andropogoneae